Zhangzheng is a town under the administration of Xingqing District, Yinchuan, Ningxia, China. , it administers Hengcheng Huayuan Community and the following 12 villages:
Zhangzheng Village
Chunlin Village
Walu Village
Wuduqiao Village
Zhenhe Village
Kongque Village
Yongnan Village
Jianfuqiao Village
Qiangjiamiao Village
Yangjiazhai Village
Maosheng Village
Hengcheng Village

References 

Township-level divisions of Ningxia
Yinchuan